Don't Fade Away is a 2011 coming-of-age drama film starring Mischa Barton and Ryan Kwanten. The film has been produced by Origin Entertainment Group and was shot in Los Angeles and North Carolina. It was released on DVD in Australia on April 6, 2011.

Plot
Life was easy for Jackson White (Kwanten). With looks, brains, and athletic ability, the world's possibilities seemed limitless. But, when he came to Los Angeles to pursue a career in the music industry, he was so seduced by money and status that he lost track of who he was. Now, with both his personal and professional lives on the edge of ruin, he's been called home to care for his dying father. While in North Carolina and Los Angeles, he'll have to confront the friends he lost track of and the girl he never met.

Cast
 Mischa Barton as Kat
 Ryan Kwanten as Jackson White
 Beau Bridges as Chris White
 Ja Rule as Foster
 Jenn Sterger as Amber

References

External links
 
 
 

2011 films
American drama films
Films set in New York (state)
Films set in North Carolina
Films shot in North Carolina
Films shot in California
2011 drama films
2010s English-language films
2010s American films